Francesco Casagrande (born 14 September 1970 in Florence) is an Italian former professional road racing cyclist. Casagrande was a professional cyclist between 1992 and 2005.

Biography
He was a proven performer in the Grand Tours and the major one-day races. He wore the leader's jersey into the penultimate stage of the 2000 Giro d'Italia, but faltered badly and wound up 2nd to fellow Italian Stefano Garzelli. Casagrande did, however, win the mountains classification, wearing the corresponding green jersey on the podium.

In major one-day races, he has won the Clásica de San Sebastián in 1998 and 1999, followed by the 2000 editions of the La Flèche Wallonne and Subida a Urkiola. Also in 1999, he placed 4th in the World Cycling Championships Road Race behind Óscar Freire, Markus Zberg, and Jean-Cyril Robin. 
 
In his early career, Casagrande won the 1996 Tirreno–Adriatico and Tour of the Basque Country — both one-week stage races. In 1998, Casagrande tested positive for doping with testosterone during the Tour de Romandie, and consequently was fired by his team . He was originally given a six-month sentence, later extended to nine months by the UCI. He returned to racing at the 1999 Tour de Suisse, a race that he won, taking the leader's jersey away from Laurent Jalabert on stage 9. Casagrande also scored victories at the 2001 and 2002 Giro del Trentino and the 2002 Settimana Ciclistica Internazionale Coppi-Bartali. In the 2002 Giro d'Italia, Casagrande was expelled from the race, after knocking down another cyclist. In 2003, Casagrande won two mountain stages in the Tour de Suisse, but lost the leader's jersey in the penultimate day's time trial to Alexander Vinokourov. He was unable to start the last stage due to urethritis. Casagrande was barred from competing in the 2004 Vuelta a España a day before its start due to a high hematocrit level, indicating the use of erythropoietin (EPO), a popular doping product. In 2005, Casagrande retired.

Major results

1991 
 1st  Overall Girobio
1992 
 2nd Gran Premio Industrie del Marmo
1993 
 1st Stage 5 Giro di Puglia
 2nd Tre Valli Varesine
 4th Giro di Toscana
 6th Overall Giro del Trentino
 7th Giro della Romagna
 7th Giro del Veneto
 7th Giro dell'Appennino
 8th Giro di Campania
 10th Trofeo Melinda 
1994
 1st Milano–Torino
 1st Giro di Toscana
 1st Giro dell'Emilia
 1st Firenze–Pistoia
 1st GP Industria & Artigianato di Larciano
 2nd Road race, National Road Championships
 2nd Overall Vuelta a los Valles Mineros
 2nd Coppa Sabatini
 2nd Coppa Placci
 2nd Coppa Bernocchi
 2nd Trofeo Melinda 
 2nd Trofeo dello Scalatore
 4th Overall Tour of the Basque Country
 4th Trofeo Matteotti
 5th Overall Tirreno–Adriatico
 5th Overall Settimana Internazionale di Coppi e Bartali
 6th La Flèche Wallonne
 7th Overall Critérium International 
 8th Giro della Romagna
 8th Monte Carlo–Alassio
 10th Züri-Metzgete
1995
 1st Giro dell'Appennino
 1st Coppa Placci
 1st Firenze–Pistoia
 2nd Overall Tour de Romandie
 2nd Grand Prix Pino Cerami
 2nd Gran Premio Città di Camaiore
 3rd Overall Escalada a Montjuïc
 3rd Milano–Torino
 3rd Coppa Agostoni
 3rd Giro della Romagna
 4th La Flèche Wallonne
 4th Coppa Sabatini
 5th Liège–Bastogne–Liège
 6th Overall Setmana Catalana de Ciclisme
 6th Coppa Bernocchi
 7th Giro di Lombardia
 8th Trofeo Pantalica
 10th Overall Giro d'Italia
1996
 1st  Overall Tirreno–Adriatico
 1st  Overall Tour of the Basque Country
1st Stages 2 & 5b (ITT)
 2nd Overall Giro di Puglia
1st Stage 3 
 2nd GP Industria & Artigianato di Larciano
 3rd Overall Setmana Catalana de Ciclisme
 4th Overall Hofbrau Cup
 4th Tre Valli Varesine
 4th Coppa Agostoni
 5th Milano–Torino
 9th Clásica de San Sebastián
 10th Trofeo Laigueglia
1997 
 1st Giro della Romagna
 2nd Road race, National Road Championships
 3rd Giro di Lombardia
 3rd Trofeo Laigueglia
 3rd Giro del Lazio
 4th Overall Escalada a Montjuïc
 4th Milan–San Remo
 4th Giro dell'Appennino
 4th Trofeo Matteotti
 4th Coppa Placci
 5th Overall Tour Méditerranéen
 5th Trofeo Melinda 
 5th Gran Premio Bruno Beghelli
 6th Overall Tour de France
 6th Overall Setmana Catalana de Ciclisme
 6th Gran Premio Industria e Commercio di Prato
 6th GP Industria & Artigianato di Larciano
 8th Coppa Sabatini
 9th Overall Tirreno–Adriatico
 10th Overall Volta a la Comunitat Valenciana
1998
 1st Clásica de San Sebastián
 1st Trofeo Matteotti
 1st Stage 1 Tour Méditerranéen
 2nd Classique des Alpes
 3rd Overall Tour de Romandie
 3rd Overall Giro del Trentino
 4th Liège–Bastogne–Liège
 4th Gran Premio Città di Camaiore
 5th Overall Tour de Suisse
 8th Tour du Haut Var
1999
 1st  Overall Tour de Suisse
1st Stage 8 
 1st Clásica de San Sebastián
 1st Trofeo Matteotti
 2nd Giro del Veneto
 2nd Giro del Lazio
 2nd Gran Premio Città di Camaiore
 3rd Tre Valli Varesine
 3rd Giro della Romagna
 3rd Coppa Agostoni
 3rd Coppa Placci
 3rd Gran Premio Industria e Commercio di Prato
 4th Road race, UCI Road World Championships
 5th Giro dell'Emilia
 9th Milano–Torino
2000
 1st La Flèche Wallonne
 1st Coppa Placci
 1st Subida a Urkiola
 2nd Overall Giro d'Italia
1st  Mountains classification 
1st Stage 9
 2nd Giro di Lombardia
 2nd HEW Cyclassics
 2nd Giro del Veneto
 3rd Züri-Metzgete
 3rd Gran Premio Città di Camaiore
 4th Giro del Lazio
 5th GP Industria & Artigianato di Larciano
 9th Liège–Bastogne–Liège
 10th Road race, UCI Road World Championships
 10th Overall Settimana Internazionale di Coppi e Bartali
 10th Amstel Gold Race
2001
 1st  Overall Giro del Trentino
1st Stage 1 
 1st Coppa Agostoni
 1st Trofeo Melinda
 2nd Clásica de San Sebastián
 2nd Giro dell'Emilia
 2nd Gran Premio Industria e Commercio di Prato
 2nd GP Industria & Artigianato di Larciano
 4th Overall Route du Sud
1st Stage 4
 4th Liège–Bastogne–Liège
 4th Giro del Veneto
 4th Züri-Metzgete
 5th Trofeo Pantalica
 5th Firenze–Pistoia
 6th Overall Tour of the Basque Country
 6th La Flèche Wallonne
 6th Gran Premio Città di Camaiore
 8th Giro della Provincia di Siracusa
2002
 1st  Overall Giro del Trentino
1st Stage 2
 1st  Overall Settimana Internazionale di Coppi e Bartali
 2nd Trofeo Melinda
 2nd Firenze–Pistoia
 3rd Road race, National Road Championships
 3rd Gran Premio Città di Camaiore
 3rd GP Industria & Artigianato di Larciano
 4th Giro del Veneto
 5th Giro di Lombardia
 5th Grand Prix of Aargau Canton
 6th Trofeo Pantalica
 7th Overall Vuelta a España
 8th Liège–Bastogne–Liège
 9th Overall Tour de Suisse
1st Stage 5
 10th La Flèche Wallonne
2003
 1st Coppa Agostoni
 1st Trofeo Melinda
 Tour de Suisse
1st Stages 3 & 5 
 2nd Overall Settimana Internazionale di Coppi e Bartali
1st Stage 1b (TTT)
 2nd Overall Brixia Tour
 3rd Overall Euskal Bizikleta
1st Stage 4a 
 4th Clásica de San Sebastián
 5th Liège–Bastogne–Liège
 5th Giro dell'Emilia
 5th Giro di Toscana
 5th Coppa Placci
 5th Gran Premio Industria e Commercio di Prato
 5th GP Industria & Artigianato di Larciano
 6th Amstel Gold Race
 7th Gran Premio Città di Camaiore
2004
 2nd Giro dell'Emilia
 2nd Subida a Urkiola
 3rd Milano–Torino
 8th Coppa Sabatini
 9th Trofeo Matteotti
2005
 5th Overall Settimana Internazionale di Coppi e Bartali

Grand Tour general classification results timeline

See also
List of doping cases in cycling
List of sportspeople sanctioned for doping offences

References

External links

1970 births
Cyclists from Florence
Living people
Italian male cyclists
Cyclists at the 2000 Summer Olympics
Cyclists at the 1996 Summer Olympics
Olympic cyclists of Italy
Italian Giro d'Italia stage winners
Doping cases in cycling
Tour de Suisse stage winners
UCI Road World Rankings winners
20th-century Italian people
21st-century Italian people